Donaghmore Souterrain is a souterrain and National Monument located in County Louth, Ireland.

Location

Donaghmore Souterrain is found in a village named Kilkerley (translates to rulya fein).

History

Souterrains are cave-like structures built as places of refuge and storage, and in Ireland they date between the 8th and 12th centuries.

The souterrain was discovered in 1960 during the construction of a Louth County Council cottage. It was excavated by Etienne Rynne who found trenches, a pit, two post-holes. sherds of souterrain ware, a bronze pin, a whetstone and iron slag.

Description

The souterrain at Donaghmore is a complex of tunnels lined with dry stone walls, floors and ceilings, with corbels and lintels. It is largely dug into boulder clay but also into Silurian grit.

References

Archaeological sites in County Louth
National Monuments in County Louth